The Permanente Quarry is a limestone quarry in an unincorporated area of Santa Clara County, California, just west of Cupertino, California. The quarry is a limestone and aggregate mining operation and cement plant, owned by Lehigh Southwest Cement, a subsidiary of Heidelberg Cement. Since 1939 the plant has been in operation and is responsible for the production of more than half of the cement used in the Bay Area. Roughly 70 percent of the cement used in the communities of Santa Clara County is acquired from the cement plant.

Located in the foothills above Cupertino on the northeast slopes of Black Mountain, the quarry runs east-west parallel to the upper watershed of Permanente Creek to the south and to Permanente Ridge and Rancho San Antonio Open Space Preserve to the north.

The limestone rock found in the Permanente Creek valley and on the summit of Black Mountain is relatively unique in the Bay Area. Microfossils in the limestone deposits suggest that the mountain originated as a seamount at 22 degrees north in the tropical Pacific about 100 million years ago and was transported to Los Altos by the Pacific Plate. These rocks occur as jagged gray boulders and outcrops just southwest of the radio towers on the summit of Black Mountain, as well as in the Permanente Quarry.

History
The quarry was founded by Henry J. Kaiser as the Kaiser Permanente Cement Plant in 1939, taking the name of the business from the Permanente Creek in whose valley it lies. Additionally, Kaiser Cement Company built Highway 101, Highway 85 and other major Northern California landmarks from the quarry. The cement plant is the primary reason for the lone railroad line that runs through the city. Hanson Cement acquired Kaiser Cement for $200 million in 1986. The cement company was renamed Hanson Permanente Cement in 1999. At the time of sale, Kaiser Cement was the 5th largest producer of cement in the entire United States.

Economic problems and bankruptcy
Hanson Permanente Cement filed for Chapter 11 bankruptcy with the US Bankruptcy Court in 2016. The bankruptcy is related to more than 14,000 injury lawsuits. The previous year Hanson Permanente Cement was ordered to spend $5 million to install an advanced wastewater treatment plant along with $2.55 million in civil penalties.

Pollution

Mercury emissions & impact on human health
The cement plant at the quarry has been fueled by petroleum coke since 2007, the latter (along with the limestone itself) is a major source of mercury emissions. A 2011 study showed a significant geographic association between the occurrence of autism in local school districts, such as the Cupertino Union School District, and higher levels of ambient mercury generated by coal-fired power plants in Bexar County, Texas and the Permanente Quarry cement plant in Santa Clara County, California.

Selenium discharge
Groundwater fills the current quarry and is pumped into Permanente Creek. Selenium pollution in the creek downstream from the quarry ranged from 13 to 81 micrograms/liter (μg/L). A North Quarry water sample in January 2010 had a dissolved selenium concentration of 82 μg/L, indicating that the quarry is the source of the selenium pollution. Selenium is bioaccumulated in the aquatic food web. Safety standards for selenium concentrations in fresh water are 5 μg/L under the California Toxics Rule (same as the National Toxics Rule set by the U.S. Environmental Protection Agency (USEPA) in 2000 and 2012.

Sediment discharges
Anthropization related to quarry operations and the cement plant have resulted in sediment discharges into Permanente Creek that are 3.5 times what would be expected under undeveloped conditions. Sediment loads in the upper Permanente Creek mainstem are 15 times those in the West Fork Permanente Creek, which drains mostly parkland. These sediment loads could threaten the resident rainbow trout (Oncorhynchus mykiss) population in the creek.

Opposition
Under the terms of a 1985 reclamation plan, the quarry was not supposed to dump quarry waste materials more than 100 feet higher than the natural chaparral ridge known as Permanente Ridge. This waste material storage area, or WMSA, was piled on and above the Permanente Ridge and this brownish-gray scar is visible from much of the southern Bay Area – despite claims from the 2004 owner, Hanson Cement, that it was hydroseeded annually with native grass mix and that they planted 80% of the area in trees and shrubs, it remains (see photo inset) a barren zone, degrading the aesthetic value of the adjacent Rancho San Antonio Open Space Preserve. This barren ridge line, referred to by Lehigh Southwest as the West Materials Storage Area (WMSA) is visible to much of the Silicon Valley.

On December 19, 2011, the Sierra Club sued Lehigh Southwest Cement Company and Heidelberg Cement in federal court to stop its unpermitted discharges of selenium and other toxic water pollutants into Permanente Creek. The Sierra Club maintains that Lehigh has been polluting Permanente Creek in violation of the clean water act for years that it has been listed as an “impaired water body” by both the U.S. Environmental Protection Agency and the San Francisco Bay Regional Water Quality Control Board. Lehigh's own water quality analyses have demonstrated that quarry pit wastewater that Lehigh discharges into the creek has been 16 times higher than Clean Water Act stream standards. Such pollution would be especially harmful to aquatic life in downstream areas such as Rancho San Antonio County Park, where selenium concentrations are often more than five times higher than state and federal standards allow.

On June 7, 2012, the County of Santa Clara Board of Supervisors approved amendments to the 1985 Permanente Quarry Reclamation Plan for Lehigh Southwest Cement Company, including approval of a new waste material storage area (EMSA) at the east end of the quarry.  The newly approved Reclamation Plan has 89 conditions (significantly more than the 73 conditions in the 1985 Amendment), and calls for higher performance standards for re-vegetation of all disturbed areas, minimizing selenium runoff and an increased level of reporting and monitoring. The Board also ratified the Final Environmental Impact Report in accordance with the California Environmental Quality Act.

In December 2012 the Midpeninsula Regional Open Space District filed a lawsuit against Santa Clara County, challenging the reclamation plan for Lehigh Southwest Cement's Permanente Quarry near Cupertino, saying its environmental impact report failed to analyze and mitigate the project's impacts on air quality, hazardous materials, recreation, groundwater and endangered species.

In 2013, Lehigh settled the lawsuit by paying at least $10 million "to implement a water treatment system." Part of the settlement is "a $12 million surety bond to guarantee that the work is done."

2011 shooting
On October 5, 2011, the Lehigh Southwest Cement plant was the site of a shooting committed by a disgruntled employee, 47-year-old Shareef Allman. During a safety meeting at 4:00 a.m., Allman opened fire with a .223-caliber semiautomatic rifle and a .40-caliber handgun, killing three coworkers and wounding six others. He later shot and wounded a woman and attempted to carjack her a few hours after the shooting. The shooting prompted a manhunt which caused a lockdown to some schools and businesses in nearby communities. Allman was confronted by Santa Clara County sheriff's deputies the next day in a neighborhood in Sunnyvale, in which he pointed a firearm towards them and three deputies responded with gunfire. It was initially reported that Allman died from the officer's gunshots, but it was later determined he died from a self-inflicted gunshot wound to the head.

References

External links
Map images of the quarry.
Committee for Green Foothills (group against expansion of the quarry)
News article about the cement plant
Information on the City of Cupertino Website

Quarries in the United States
Cupertino, California
Geography of Santa Clara County, California
Limestone industry